"Take My Bones Away" is a song by American heavy metal band Baroness. The song was released as the first single from the band's third studio album Yellow & Green.

Track listing

Charts

Personnel
John Dyer Baizley – lead vocals, rhythm guitar, bass, keyboards
Pete Adams – lead guitar, backing vocals
Allen Blickle – drums

References

2012 songs
2012 singles
Baroness (band) songs